Synesthesia is a neurologically based phenomenon in which stimulation of one sensory or cognitive pathway leads to automatic, involuntary experiences in a second sensory or cognitive pathway. There are many occurrences of synesthesia in books, television and film.

Uses in television 
 In a scene from the NBC sitcom 30 Rock, Jack Donaghy is in the hospital. Liz Lemon goes up to him, and Donaghy says, "They gave me some drugs. Now my mouth tastes like purple."
 In a scene from the Fox medical drama House, a character played by Essence Atkins is in the hospital asking for House's help and says, "I started to hear through the eyes."
 In a scene from the Futurama episode "Roswell That Ends Well", Fry asks: "What smells like blue?" In a scene from "The Why of Fry", he asks: "Did everything just taste purple for a second?"
 The protagonist Canaan from the anime television series CANAAN is a Middle Eastern mercenary and assassin who fights with the aid of her heightened senses and her ability to see emotions and intents as colors. It is also detailed that her synesthesia converts sound to smell and color to sound.
 In the NBC science fiction series Heroes, the deaf character Emma (played by Deanne Bray) suddenly begins to see sounds as waves of color. Holding the cello in her hands, she senses vibrations as sounds which converts to a synesthetic experience of colors.
 Rachel Pirzad in the SyFy channel original series Alphas is a hyperactive synesthete.
 Criminal Minds, season 8, episode 9 featured a killer named Carl Finster with synesthesia that allowed him to see words of people speaking to him, associating colors with certain emotions: white determined the speaker was being honest and sincere, yellow determined that the speaker was lying, and red determined that the speaker was truly "evil". Mistakenly believing his synesthesia was a super power he developed a delusion where he was a superhero, using his condition to single out liars and "evil ones" and brutally kill them.
Rust Cohle, a character in HBO's 2014 crime drama True Detective, experiences synesthesia as tastes, smells and visions throughout the investigation of a Louisiana murder.
In a scene in the anime Zankyou no Terror, the main character Twelve tells Lisa that he has synesthesia and can "see colors in sounds", using the color of her voice as pale yellow, as an example.
In Season 2, Episode 4 of The Listener, synesthesia is a brief topic of dissuasion in the start of the episode.
In the 2015 South Korean drama The Girl Who Sees Smells, the main character Eun-seol awakens from a coma with the ability to "see" smells as visible colors and shapes, and can even trace where people have been using their lingering scents as a trail.
In the 2014 TNT show The Librarians, the character Cassandra Cillian is a synesthete and utilizes her gifts with each episode to solve crimes.
In the 2015 show X Company, the character Alfred has synesthesia as well as an eidetic memory. He uses his unique mind to help in his work as a spy during World War 2.

Uses in other media 
In "Frankenstein", the monster describes having synesthesia after his creation
 The 2007 novel, Wade of Aquitaine, concerns a young man and a young woman separated by 1,200 years who use their rare forms of synesthesia aided by acupuncture to astral travel to each other's times.
 The plot of the 2007 book The Name of this Book is Secret (by Pseudonymous Bosch) concerns synesthesia in many ways. Many characters have synesthesia: the Bergamo twins use their ability to perform impressive "mind-reading" magic tricks, and a boy at the protagonists' school, Benjamin Blake, produces abstract art from his synesthesic experiences. Antagonists Dr. L and Ms. Mauvais also kidnap children with synesthesia because they believe synesthesia is the gateway to immortality.
 In James Thurber's short story "The Cane in the Corridor", a case of synesthesia is mentioned where a man attempts to describe what the sound of a telephone looks like.
 The 1950 short story "The Man with English" by H. L. Gold has a patient with senses reversed (hot feels cold, smooth feels rough, etc.) undergo corrective surgery.  Coming out of anesthesia, the patient sniffs the air, and asks "What smells purple?"
 In The Memory Artist by Jeffrey Moore, the protagonist, Noel, has both synesthesia and hypermnesia, allowing him to not only see the world in colours and shapes, but to vividly remember every detail of it -  none of which he can use to prevent his beloved mother from slowly losing her own memories to Alzheimer's.
 In Natsu Miyashita's novel A Forest of Wool and Steel, and its subsequent film adaptation, a young piano tuner smells the forest whenever he hears certain notes played.
 In several scenes from the Disney/Pixar film Ratatouille, Remy expresses different flavors with music and visual symbols across the screen, which is not actually an example of synesthesia but is actually just a visual representation for the benefit of the audience.
 In the comic book series Top Ten by Alan Moore, the character Detective Wanda "Synaesthesia" Jackson has advanced synaesthesia, which leads into the realm of clairvoyance. Once upon examining a crime scene, Detective Jackson begins to hum a tune by Beethoven. Later, she realizes she had been sensing the criminal's perfume, Ode to Joy.  Further, she relates touch to taste: she describes the touch of an ex-boyfriend's skin as "tasting ashes."
 In The War of the Worlds, Dr. Forrester theorizes that Martians may have the ability to smell colors. However, he does not expand upon the theory later in the film.
In the children's novel A Mango-Shaped Space by Wendy Mass, the protagonist, Mia, has synesthesia. When she enters the 8th grade, her synesthesia becomes public knowledge; this puts the shy heroine into the spotlight.
 In the game Mass Effect, when the main characters attempt to communicate with the Rachni Queen, a highly alien life form, the latter uses metaphors in its speech which highly resemble synesthesia ("songs the color of oily shadow").
 In the book Mondays are Red by Nicola Morgan, the protagonist Luke wakes up from a coma to find that he has developed synesthesia.
 In Black Sun Rising, the character Lady Ciani describes an adept's sight as a maelstrom of colors where a non-adept could see naught but thin air. This may be a strange form of synesthesia.
Near the conclusion of Alfred Bester's award-winning sci-fi novel The Stars My Destination, the story's protagonist Gully Foyle experiences synaesthesia as a result of a concussion from an explosion. His resulting sensations are represented in the book by distorted type.
In Sigmund Brouwer's Absolute Pressure, the main character has synesthesia, which makes him think that he is "too weird" to have a girlfriend.
In the 2009 film The Soloist, there is a visual on-screen depiction of the subject of the film experiencing synesthesia. This occurs while listening to a rehearsal of the Los Angeles Philharmonic.
In the 2010 novel Scream by Nigel McCrery, the main character Mark Lapslie has lexical-gustatory synesthesia.
In the web comic Fredo & Pidjin, a pigeon has numeric-olfactory synesthesia.
In the teen psychological/SF thriller Ultraviolet by R.J. Anderson, the protagonist Alison has multiple experiences of synesthesia which are described from her point of view and are key to the development of the story. 
In Scott Westerfeld's futuristic sci-fi novel The Risen Empire, neurological implants evoke synesthetic detection of wireless transmitted audio and holographic imagery.
In the book Starseeker by Tim Bowler, the protagonist Luke Stanton is a musical genius who associates colours with musical notes, seeing colours and images when he hears music played.
In the webcomic Homestuck, alien troll Terezi Pyrope is blinded, but learns to see by "coloring" the smells of things around her. Likewise, her ancestor, Latula Pyrope, loses her sense of smell, and learns to "smell" using her eyes, smelling the colors.
 In the book Exodus Code by Carole E. Barrowman and John Barrowman, the leader of Torchwood Captain Jack Harkness and only surviving member Gwen Cooper were said to be synesthetes. In the book, various synesthetes start behaving strangely as their senses are heightened due to some mysterious cause.
In Sharon M. Draper's Out of My Mind the main character is a brilliant, yet severely disabled, preteen with synesthesia, but without the ability to speak a single word. She is able to hear the colors of music and remember old memories in colors.
 In the 2010 Disney film Tangled, the character Flynn Rider casually remarks that the pub he is in "smells like the color brown."
 The 2013 novel, The First of July by Elizabeth Speller, one character sees colors when music is played, and also feels the pain of injuries he witnesses.
In the 2015 children's fantasy novel The Secret on the Second Shelf by Jonathan White, the main character Timothy Shaw discovers that both he and his mum have synaesthesia, and this becomes the key defense against the evil race of human-bird shifting Deceivers in the story. The Deceivers have been in an ancient battle with the Seekers - who seek out synaesthetes on Earth to help them defeat the Deceivers.
 In the concept album Communications, the character Nancy Elsner perceives voices as colors, and her song Housewife Radio revolves around how she can't accept her husband's death because she can still sense the color of his voice playing from her radio.
 In David Baldacci's Memory Man (Grand Central Publishing 2015, Amos Decker #1/Memory Man Series Book 1), followed by The Last Mile, The Fix, and The Fallen.  Amos Decker also is unable to forget any detail as a result of a football injury.
 In Anna Ferrara's 'The Woman Who Tried To Be Normal (Those Strange Women #3)', the main character Helen Mendel 'sees sounds, hears images and tastes feelings' which allows her to detect lies and sense emotions most people aren't able to detect.
 In the web comic “Space Boy” by Stephen McCranie, the main character associates people with flavors. She can judge someone’s personality without even getting to know them.
 In the Red Sparrow book trilogy , written by former CIA diplomat Jason Matthews, the protagonist, Dominika Egorova, is described to experience synesthesia that extends beyond words and sounds to human emotions. She is said to see coloured halo's around people's heads and shoulders that display their emotions and character.
 The protagonist in the horror film Masking Threshold describes strange correlations between what he does and touches, and what he hears.
 The character Poppy Rowan from the doll line Rainbow High, made by MGA Entertainment, states that she has synesthesia in the accompanying Rainbow High cartoon series. As a music focus in the series, she uses her synesthesia to influence her music production and incorporates use of colour and light into her project presentations.
 The character Sora Harukawa, from the game Ensemble Stars!, is mentioned to have synesthesia that allows him to see the colors of people's emotions.
 The character Saki Izumo from D4DJ is said to have synesthesia and sees colors in music.

References

Synesthesia
Fiction about diseases and disorders